Open eBook (OEB), or formally, the Open eBook Publication Structure (OEBPS), is a legacy e-book format which has been superseded by the EPUB format. It was "based primarily on technology developed by SoftBook Press". and on XML. OEB was released with a free version belonging to public domain and a full
version to be used with or without DRM by the publishing industry.

Open eBook is a ZIP file plus a Manifest file. Inside the package a defined subset of XHTML may be used, along with CSS and Dublin Core metadata. The default file extension is .opf (OEB Package Format).

Specification release history
 September 2007 – Open Publication Structure (OPS) 2.0, EPUB. Released, supersedes the OEBPS 1.2
 August 2002 – OEBPS 1.2 Recommended Specification Released
 June 2001 – OEBPS 1.0.1 replaces OEBPS 1.0
 September 1999 – Open eBook Publication Structure (OEBPS) 1.0 released

Reader software
 SoftBook
 Adobe Digital Editions
 FBReader – GPL e-book reader for Unix/Windows computers.
 Lexcycle Stanza
 Mobipocket
 Openberg Lector – cross-platform reader released under the GPL and based on Mozilla platform

Reader devices
 SoftBook
 Sony Reader –  the Sony Reader PRS-505 supports the EPUB file format.
 Intel Reader
 Barnes & Noble Nook
 Kobo eReader

See also
 Comparison of e-book formats
 Open Packaging Conventions

References

External links
 Open eBook Forum
 Openberg
 Open Publication Structure (OPS) 2.0
 Adobe's Sample eBook Library
 Article "EPUB" at the MobileRead Wiki
 ePub Validator - This utility allows to validate the epub file to ePub standards of 1.0.5
 https://github.com/idpf/epubcheck
 EPUB Validator (beta)

Markup languages
XML-based standards